Sunset at Montmajour is a landscape in oils painted by the Dutch artist Vincent van Gogh on 4 July 1888. It was painted while the artist was at Arles, France and depicts a landscape of garrigue with the ruins of Montmajour Abbey in the background. For over 100 years, it was in a Norwegian industrialist's private collection and wrongly assumed to be fake, before being re-examined, authenticated and sold to its current private owner. The painting was temporarily on display from 24 September 2013 until 12 January 2014 as part of an exhibition at the Van Gogh Museum in Amsterdam.

Its authenticity was questioned several times before it was confirmed as a genuine van Gogh work in 2013. It is the first full-sized painting by Van Gogh to be newly confirmed since 1928.

History
The painting was inventoried among Theo van Gogh's collection of his brother's works in 1890. It was sold in 1901 by his widow, Johanna van Gogh-Bonger, to a Paris art dealer. In 1908, the art dealer sold it to Christian Nicolai Mustad.

In 1908 a Norwegian industrialist, Christian Nicolai Mustad, who believed it to be the work of van Gogh, purchased and displayed the painting at his home. According to Mustad's family, the French ambassador to Sweden, while a guest at Mustad's home, advised that it probably was not by van Gogh. At that time Mustad took it down from display. The painting remained stored in his attic until Mustad's death, when it reappeared as part of his estate.

Authentication

In the 1990s, the painting was shown to staff at the Van Gogh Museum, but it was dismissed as not the work of van Gogh because it was not signed. With the development of improved investigative techniques, however, in 2011 a two-year investigation was launched by the Van Gogh Museum to examine the possible authenticity of the painting. The painting was subjected to a detailed investigation of style and materials. It was discovered to have been painted in the same range of paints that appears in works by van Gogh at that period, which led to further research. Among the evidence that confirmed the painting's authenticity was a letter written by Vincent van Gogh to his brother Theo on 5 July 1888, describing a landscape that he had painted the previous day: 

On 9 September 2013, the Van Gogh Museum announced in a public unveiling of the painting, that the work had been confirmed as a painting by van Gogh.

Reception
Martin Bailey praised Sunset at Montmajour as "a major addition to [van Gogh's] oeuvre."

See also
List of works by Vincent van Gogh

References

External links

1888 paintings
Landscape paintings
Paintings by Vincent van Gogh
Paintings of Arles by Vincent van Gogh